Sundquist is a surname. Notable people with the surname include:

Alma Sundquist (1872–1940), Swedish physician and gynaecologist
Axel Sundquist (1867–1910), chief carpenter's mate in the United States Navy during the Spanish–American War who received the Medal of Honor for bravery
Bjørn Sundquist (born 1948), Norwegian actor, famous for TV, theatre, and movie roles
Don Sundquist (born 1936), American businessman and politician who served as the 47th Governor of Tennessee from 1995 to 2003
Elma Sundquist (1865–1936), Swedish socialist and journalist
Eric Sundquist, American scholar of the literature and culture of the United States
Folke Sundquist (1925–2009), Swedish film actor
Gerry Sundquist (1955–1993), English actor
Gustav A. Sundquist (1879–1918), ordinary seaman serving in the United States Navy during the Spanish–American War who received the Medal of Honor for bravery
John Sundquist, the executive director of the Board of International Ministries of American Baptist Churches USA during 1990–2003
Josh Sundquist, Paralympian, a bestselling author and motivational speaker
Kalle Sundquist (born 1962), Swedish sprint canoeist who competed from the mid-1980s to the early 1990s
Ragnar Sundquist, popular Swedish accordionist and composer in the first half of the 1900s
Scott Sundquist, drummer for the grunge band Soundgarden during the mid-1980s
Ted Sundquist (born 1962), American football player, manager and commentator

See also
SUNIST